Teen Missions International (TMI) is an interdenominational Christian mission organization specializing in running short-term mission trips for youth, teenager, and adult participation. The organization was started in 1970 in Ohio and was later moved to Florida.

The Lord's Boot Camp

TMI's main, and longest running, Boot Camp is based out of Merritt Island Florida. Boot Camp is a two-week training period in which teams learn basic construction and evangelism skills, as well as cooperation and teamwork. The idea is to present a simulation of the circumstances they may encounter overseas. Boot Camp has to be as primitive as the most primitive teams. The aim of Teen Missions is to train tomorrows missionaries today and provide teenagers with a way to serve God now, with ways that some have accused of being abusive, neglectful, and controversial in nature.

Mission Trip Age Groups & Program Focus

Teen Missions International teams and mission trips are divided up into five different age groups.

TEEN Mission Trips (Ages 13–19 years)

The largest and most popular of these groups is the Teen Boot Camp teams. Teen mission trips focus on spiritual and character development in addition to offering work and evangelism assistance to the host mission on the field. The length of Teen mission trips vary slightly depending on location, but they average between 6 and 8 weeks.

PRETEEN Mission Trips (Ages 10–13 years)

Preteen teams are the second most popular group. Preteen teams have a separate Boot Camp training schedule and also run the Obstacle Course (which is slightly modified for their smaller size). The Preteen program focuses on character building and control of attitudes and actions. Preteens receive classes such as Bible Timeline, personal evangelism, music, drama and puppets. Control classes at Boot Camp include canoeing and bike riding. A typical Preteen trip runs around 4–5 weeks. Trip locations, like teens, are all over the world.

ADULT Mission Trips

Teen Missions also organizes Adult mission trips that travel at various times of the year, most trips run between January and April. Adult trips normally last for about two weeks and most serve at an established Teen Missions base overseas. Projects include community development projects (sewing school uniforms, building grinding mills, granaries, and drinking water wells).

Special Blessings Training (SBs)

Teen Missions is known for their strict Boot Camp training and well disciplined teams. An aspect unique to TMI is their form of discipline, referred to as Special Blessings Training (SBs to staff and team members). Team members serve an SB by serving on an assigned work project during their free time. It usually involves a very physically exhausting job during a time when they should be resting. These are used as free labor.

Obstacle Course (The OC) 

Teen Missions believes that it is important to send out well trained and unified teams. Therefore, as part of boot camp (usually lasting about 2 weeks) teams run a vigorous course of obstacles to help promote team building, sense of accomplishment, and reliance on others. Obstacles include Mount Sinai, a very large tire mountain, Jacobs Ladder, a large cargo net ladder, The Slough of Despond, a rope swing over a usually muddy pool of water and the Wall, a twelve-foot wall that each member must go over using only teamwork (there are steps on the back for coming down). Done in rain, or even extreme heat (in jeans, construction boots). This has led to several team members experiencing severe blisters, rashes, and overheating. Some have even shared that they were forced to wear their wet shoes all day if they didn't have an exta pair of $150 dollar steel toed shoes.

Contact With Team Members
Parents receive limited contact with their child during Boot Camp and on the field.  Three evening visits are allowed by family or clergy during the U.S. Boot Camp in Florida.  No phone calls are allowed, except for two calls of several minutes each "if possible" right before leaving for the field and upon return from the field.  Even in cases of physical sickness or medical treatment, parents do not have to be notified, even after treatment.  Regular USPS mail is allowed to be sent or received, as well as emails (team members cannot send emails, they may only receive them) during Boot Camp.  During boot camp, no cell phones are allowed on premise.  Adult leaders on teams (except for one head leader) are allowed to bring cell phones with them when they travel to or on the field for emergency use.

There have been reports of staff reading letters before they are sent to family/given to members.

New Mission Trips

Teen Missions usually announces next year's locations in July once the current summer teams have arrived in Florida for training.

Number of available teams varies from age group to age group.

As to be expected, Teen Teams have the largest variety, followed by Preteen, and so on.

Please note that just because a team is offered, that does not mean that it will happen. Teams can be canceled at any moment, for any reason. These reasons usually consist of either lack of interest or changes in the host country or with the host mission.

Most teams serve in work and evangelism, but some team projects are exclusively evangelistic (i.e. Drama, Choir or Sports teams). Work teams go to project locations to do a construction or landscaping project for the host ministry or Teen Missions Overseas Base where they will be staying. The work can include masonry, carpentry, landscaping, painting, plumbing, etc. Work teams do evangelism programs mainly on the weekends when they don't need to do the work project. Evangelism can include singing, drama, puppets and sermons/testimonies. On Sundays teams will take part in the worship service of a local church. Evangelism teams will focus mainly on doing evangelistic presentations. These will also include singing, drama, puppets and sermons/ testimonies; but may be specialized. There are some special mission trips which have a unique ministry focus in ministry or method such as backpack, boat, motorcycle, sports, film or clowning teams.

International Bases
Teen Missions operates 32 bases on 4 continents with nearly 300 fulltime staff worldwide. Each base is unique and ministry approaches are contextualized based on local needs and culture. The primary ministry efforts are as follows:

 Boot Camps — This program provides training for national youth through short-term work and evangelism projects 
 Bible Schools — Bible Missionary & Work Training Centers (BMW) provide discipleship and missionary Training using a three-year program (two years academic plus one-year internship)
 Circuit Rider Sunday Schools — Circuit Riders share the gospel with children and adults through weekly lessons in addition to teaching English using phonics exercises, games and other projects.
 Rescue Units — Mercy ministry to underprivileged children, many of whom have lost one or both parents to AIDS. Children receive assistance to get into school and learn basic agriculture using community gardening. Basic medical care is often provided as needed. Children also learn of God's love for them through Bible stories and Sunday School lessons.
 Matron Units — At-risk young girls are given a safe place to attend high school when the school is located too far for a daily commute from home. This prevents the abuse and exploitation that often occurs in some rural areas without this help.

Media
Teen Missions was featured in a "48 Hours" episode of CBS on April 12, 2008.

An article was written on Teen Missions in a Feb 15, 2008 issue of Christianity Today.

Florida Today reporter John A Torres travelled to Zambia with Teen Missions in 2006 resulting in a feature called Orphans & Angels

Sheila Wray Gregoire wrote three articles on her and others experiences of abuse under Teen Missions on her popular blog "to Love, Honor and Vacuum"

References

Citations
Anderson, Ken (1990). No Elephants Under Our Big Top. Merritt Island: Teen Missions International.

External links 
Teen Missions International's Website
Teen Missions's News
Christianity Today
Florida Today
Charity Navigator Rating for Teen Missions International
Great Nonprofits

Non-profit organizations based in Florida